The 1988 Samoa rugby union tour of Britain and Ireland was a series of ten rugby union matches played in October and November 1988 in Wales and Ireland by the Samoa national rugby union team, who competed under the name of Western Samoa at the time. Samoa lost both their international matches but won four of their eight non-international games against club and regional teams.

Matches 
Scores and results list Samoa's score first.

References

1988–89 in European rugby union
1988–89 in Welsh rugby union
1988–89 in Irish rugby union
1988 in Samoan rugby union
1988
1988
1988
1988